State Property 2 is a 2005 American crime film directed by Damon Dash and produced and distributed by Lionsgate Entertainment. A sequel to 2002's State Property, the film stars rap artists and other musicians such as Cam'ron, The Diplomats, Beanie Sigel, N.O.R.E., Kanye West, Mariah Carey and others. Championship boxers Bernard Hopkins and Winky Wright appear in cameo roles. Dash directed the film and co-created its story with Adam Moreno, who wrote the screenplay. The film marks the final appearance of Ol' Dirty Bastard.

At the very end the closing credits of the film, "R.I.P. Ol' Dirty Bastard (1968-2004)" appears on the screen. This is a dedication to Ol' Dirty Bastard, who died the previous year of a drug overdose.

Cast 
 Beanie Sigel - Beans
 N.O.R.E. - El Pollo Loco
 Damon Dash - Dame 
 Michael Bentt - Biggis
 Omillio Sparks - Baby Boy
 Oschino - D-Nice
 Freeway - Free
 Young Gunz - Chris & Neef
 Cam'ron - Cam'ron (himself)
 Juelz Santana - Juelz Suarez
 Jim Jones - Jimmy Jones
 Duan Grant - P-Nut
 Sundy Carter - Aisha
 Nicole Wray - Nicole Wray (herself)
 Kanye West - Kanye West (himself)
 Mariah Carey -  Claudia
 'Fame' Jamal Grinnage MOP - Fame
 'Billy' MOP - Billy Danz
 Ol' Dirty Bastard - Rudy
 'Fox' MOP - Fox
 Loon - El Pollo Loco's father
 Angie Martinez - Tuesday
 Omahyra Mota - El Pollo Loco's mother
 Roselyn Sánchez - District Attorney
 Bernard Hopkins - O.G.

Reception
State Property 2 received negative reviews from critics but was an improvement to its prequel generating only 14% from rotten tomatoes from 14 reviews. It also received 33% from metacritic based on 10 reviews.

See also 
 List of hood films

References

External links 
 
 

2005 films
2000s crime films
Films set in Philadelphia
Hood films
Films shot in New Jersey
Films shot in New York (state)
Lionsgate films
American independent films
2005 independent films
2000s hip hop films
Films directed by Damon Dash
2000s English-language films
2000s American films